Caroline Hebard (1944–2007) was a pioneer in the field of search and rescue dogs..

Hebard was born in Santiago, Chile on 20 June 1944. Her father was a British career diplomat who moved a lot as a result of his assignments by his government. She grew up on four continents and learned several languages in her youth.

An animal lover, Hebard became involved in the training of rescue dogs and was a co-founder of the United States Disaster Response Team, which participated in earthquake rescue missions in Mexico, Armenia, Japan and Turkey, using the ability of the dogs to located trapped survivors. She also participated with her dogs in rescue and recovery operations involving bridge collapses, floods, fires, and people lost in the wilderness. She and her dogs also participated in search and rescue operations in the aftermath of the Oklahoma City bombing and the September 11 World Trade Center attack.

Hebard received various honors for her work and is the subject of a book, So That Others May Live: Carolyn Hebard and Her Search-and-Rescue Dogs which she co-wrote.

Hebard was married to physicist Arthur F. Hebard and had four children. She died of cancer on 22 October 2007.

References

Further reading

1944 births
2007 deaths
Dog trainers